Aksenovskaya is a rural locality (a village) in Sibirskoye Rural Settlement, Verkhovazhsky District, Vologda Oblast, Russia. The population was 10 as of 2002.

Geography 
Aksenovskaya is located 44 km southeast of Verkhovazhye (the district's administrative centre) by road. Anisimovskaya is the nearest rural locality.

References 

Rural localities in Verkhovazhsky District